Mary Margaret Arnold (born September 19, 1947 in Carroll, Iowa) is an American singer. She performed with the rock group Kenny Rogers and The First Edition from 1968 to 1976.

While at Drake University, Arnold had her own TV show. While studying at the Los Angeles Conservatory of Music, Arnold auditioned for the show choir The Young Americans. She took a year off of school and toured with the group, meeting fellow singer Kenny Rogers. Her roommate was singer Thelma Camacho, who sang with Rogers in the band The First Edition. After Camacho was dismissed from the band, Arnold took her spot in the band, beating out Karen Carpenter for the role. She stayed with the band until it disbanded in 1976.

After the two were introduced by Rogers, Arnold married singer Roger Miller. After The First Edition disbanded, Mary toured and recorded with Roger until his death in 1992. After his death, Mary became president of Roger's musical trust. In 2004, she sued Sony/ATV Music Publishing to regain the rights to Roger's music. She won in district court in 2010, gaining the rights and $900,000 in damages. However, the verdict was overturned upon appeal, and Sony retained the rights to Roger Miller's catalogue.

Arnold also performed with Waylon Jennings, Glen Campbell, and George Burns. She performed at the White House twice, before the Nixons with The First Edition and before the Fords with Roger Miller. She was inducted into the Iowa Rock 'n' Roll Hall of Fame in 2009. She last appeared with The First Edition at a 2015 panel at the Country Music Hall of Fame and Museum.

References

1947 births
Living people
People from Carroll, Iowa
American women pop singers
The Young Americans members
Kenny Rogers and The First Edition members
American music industry executives